Fulay is a panchayat village in Gujarat, India. Administratively it is under Nakhatrana Taluka, Kutch District, Gujarat.  

There are two villages in the Fulay gram panchayat: Fulay and Tal.

Demographics 
In the 2001 census, the village of Fulay had 1,381 inhabitants, with 725 males (52.5%) and 656 females (47.5%), for a gender ratio of 905 females per thousand males.

Notes

Villages in Kutch district